An elevator pitch, elevator speech, lift speech or elevator statement is a short description of an idea, product, or company that explains the concept in a way such that any listener can understand it in a short period of time. This description typically explains who the thing is for, what it does, why it is needed, and how it will get done. When, explaining an individual person, the description generally explains one's skills and goals, and why they would be a productive and beneficial person to have on a team or within a company or project. An elevator pitch does not have to include all of these components, but it usually does at least explain what the idea, product, company, or person is and their value.

An elevator pitch can be used to entice an investor or executive in a company, or explain an idea to a founder's parents. The goal is simply to convey the overall concept or topic in an exciting way. Unlike a sales pitch, there may not be a clear buyer–seller relationship.

The name—elevator pitch—reflects the idea that it should be possible to deliver the summary in the time span of an elevator ride, or approximately thirty seconds to two minutes.

Background information and history 
There are many origin stories for the elevator pitch. One commonly-known origin story is that of Ilene Rosenzweig and Michael Caruso, two former journalists active in the 1990s. According to Rosenzweig, Caruso was a senior editor at Vanity Fair and was continuously attempting to pitch story ideas to the Editor-In-Chief at the time, but could never pin her down long enough to do so simply because she was always on the move. So, in order to pitch her ideas, Caruso would join her during short free periods of time she had, such as on an elevator ride. Thus, the concept of an elevator pitch was created, as says Rosenzweig.

However, there is another known potential origin story that dates back prior to the story of Rosenzweig and Caruso. Philip Crosby, author of The Art of Getting Your Own Sweet Way (1972) and Quality Is Still Free (1996) suggested individuals should have a pre-prepared speech that can deliver information regarding themselves or a quality that they can provide within a short period of time, namely the amount of time of an elevator ride for if an individual finds themselves on an elevator with a prominent figure. Essentially, an elevator pitch is meant to allow an individual to pitch themselves or an idea to a person who is high up in a company, with very limited time.

Crosby, who worked as a quality test technician, and then later as the Director of Quality at International Telephone and Telegraph, recounted how an elevator pitch could be used to push for change within the company. He planned a speech regarding the change he wanted to see and waited at the ITT headquarters elevator. Crosby stepped onto an elevator with the CEO of the company in order to deliver his speech. Once they reached the floor in which the CEO was getting off, Crosby was asked to deliver a full presentation on the topic at a meeting for all of the general managers.

Aspects 

An elevator pitch is meant to last the duration of an elevator ride, which can vary in length from approximately thirty seconds to two minutes. Therefore, the main focus of an elevator pitch should be making it short and direct. According to the Idaho Business Review, the first two sentences of any elevator pitch are the most important, and should hook or grab the attention of the listener. Information in an elevator pitch, due to the limited amount of time, should be condensed in order to express the most important ideas or concepts within the allotted time.

Furthermore, the Idaho Business Review suggests individuals who use an elevator pitch deliver it using simple language, and avoiding statistics or other language that may disrupt the focus of the listener. Bloomberg Businessweek suggests that an important lesson to think about when giving an elevator pitch is to "adjust the pitch to the person who is listening, and refine it as you and your business continue to grow and change." When delivering an elevator pitch, individuals are encouraged to remain flexible and adaptable, and to be able to deliver the pitch in a genuine and fluent fashion. By doing so, the intended audience of the pitch will likely be able to follow the information, and will not interpret it as being too scripted.

Advantages 

Advantages to conducting an elevator pitch include convenience and simplicity. For instance, elevator pitches can be given on short notice and without much preparation due to the pre-planning of the content being delivered within said pitch, making the listener more comfortable. Furthermore, elevator pitches allow the individual who is giving the pitch the ability to simplify the content and deliver it in a less complicated manner by providing the information in a cut-down fashion that gets right to the point.

See also
 High concept
 Mission statement
 Vision statement
 Business plan
 SWOT analysis

References

Further reading

Business terms
Elevators
Rhetorical techniques
Selling techniques
Statements